Romance Ranch is a 1924 American silent drama film directed by Howard M. Mitchell and starring John Gilbert, Virginia Brown Faire and John Miljan.

Cast
 John Gilbert as Carlos Brent 
 Virginia Brown Faire as Carmen Hendley 
 John Miljan as Clifton Venable 
 Bernard Siegel as Felipe Varillo 
 Evelyn Selbie as Tessa

References

Bibliography
 Munden, Kenneth White. The American Film Institute Catalog of Motion Pictures Produced in the United States, Part 1. University of California Press, 1997.

External links

1924 films
1924 drama films
Silent American drama films
Films directed by Howard M. Mitchell
American silent feature films
1920s English-language films
Fox Film films
American black-and-white films
1920s American films